An Dương may refer to several places in Vietnam, including:

An Dương District, a rural district of Haiphong
An Dương, Lê Chân, a ward of Lê Chân District in Haiphong
An Dương (township), a township and capital of An Dương District
An Dương, Bắc Giang, a commune of Tân Yên District

See also
An Dương Vương, a Vietnamese historical figure